The 2011 MPSF Tournament will be the postseason tournament of the Mountain Pacific Sports Federation to determine the MPSF's champion and automatic berth into the 2011 NCAA Division I Men's Soccer Championship.

Qualification

Bracket 

The higher seed, as well as the home team, is listed on the right.

Play-in round

Semifinals

MPSF Championship

Statistics

Top goalscorers

See also 
 Mountain Pacific Sports Federation
 2011 Mountain Pacific Sports Federation men's soccer season
 2011 in American soccer
 2011 NCAA Division I Men's Soccer Championship
 2011 NCAA Division I men's soccer season

References 

Mountain Pacific Sports Federation